Total Football is a tactical theory of soccer play. This may also refer to:

Total Football (magazine), a British soccer magazine from 1995-2001
Total Football (video game), a soccer video game published in 1995
The former name of Fox Sports FC, an Australian soccer TV show
Total Football, a 2018 song by Parquet Courts from the album Wide Awake!